Otmar Seul was born on August 30, 1943, in Trier (Germany) and held lectures at the Paris Ouest-Nanterre-La Défense (Paris X-Nanterre) from October 1989 to September 2011 as a Professor of legal German. In cooperation with his German counterpart Werner Merle, he founded the renowned integrated curriculum of French and German law in 1994–1995, joining together the University of Paris Ouest-Nanterre-La Défense (France) and the University of Potsdam (Germany). This curriculum became the centre of a European network of academic cooperation in legal sciences that is open to new forms of studies and research internationalisation. Otmar Seul's most innovative idea was the creation in 2004 of French-German summer universities with other European and non-European countries. His research on industrial democracy and employee participation in companies reflects this French-German and European intercultural dimension.

Co-founder of binational curricula: internationalisation of studies and research 

Otmar Seul read History and Romance studies at the Johannes Gutenberg University in Mainz (Germany) as well as Human Sciences at the University of Paris-Descartes. He then completed a PhD in Economic and Social Sciences in 1986 under the supervision of Eberhard Schmidt at the Carl von Ossietzky University in Oldenburg (Germany) on the consideration by French unions of the right to direct and collective expression and of other new workers’ rights established by the Auroux acts (1982–1985). Otmar Seul's interest revolves mainly around legal issues in social research and new ways of transnational legal studies.

Double degrees and integrated French-German curricula in legal sciences 

In Nanterre, Otmar Seul developed the bilingual double degree French Law / German Law, founded in 1986, extending from the undergraduate (DEUG) to the postgraduate program (Master). He also turned it into a French-German integrated curriculum in cooperation with the University of Potsdam, offering a double diploma (1994/95).  Since the 1990s, Paris Ouest-Nanterre-La Défense offered more than 25 courses of German law throughout all diplomas, thus becoming the first French University in this field. However, since it was taught in German, this program seemed to be threatened by the decreasing number of students learning the partner language, both in France and in Germany. On 12 March 2001, Otmar Seul submitted a petition to both French and German governments in which he voiced concerns about the restrained cooperation policy between Paris and Berlin.  The aim of this Appel de Nanterre was to spur on the French-German engine. It has been signed by more than one thousand teachers and students and was supported by eight former French Ambassadors in Germany, as well as by every member of the German-French Cultural High Council.

A European network of academic cooperation 

Since the 1990s, Otmar Seul has created and developed a European network of academic cooperation (Nanterre Network) in order to settle the French-German integrated curriculum in the European Higher Education and Research Area, to give its graduates access to international careers and in order to promote French and German language and legal cultures in Europe. This (informal) network, especially based on the Erasmus-Socrates agreements and regrouping more than 40 partner universities, was formed in three main steps: 1° by integrating the Law Faculties of the Humboldt University in Berlin, of Halle-Wittenberg, of Potsdam, of Dresden (TU) and other universities of the new Länder in 1990 after the German unification; 2° by opening the network to universities of Central and Eastern Europe (Poland and the Baltic States in particular) as soon as in 2000, in some cases before they even joined the EU in 2004; 3° the last to join in 2006 were the Turkish universities (among them the Universities of Istanbul, Galatasaray, Yeditepe, and Bilgi), which belonged to a country still preparing to enter the EU.

Since 1995, annual meetings have taken place in Nanterre/Paris, Siena, Berlin, Halle, Pamplona, Prague, Vilnius, Lodz, Riga, Paris, Fribourg (Switzerland), Istanbul, Sevilla, Barcelona/ Andorra, Berlin, Lisbon, Vienna, Dresden, and Zurich. Since the Bologna Declaration (1999), during these meetings, delegates from partner universities address the issue of the adaptation of their own national Higher Education system to the European standards. Coupled with a colloquium or a workshop, these meetings also lead to discussions about the broad tendencies of the ongoing law harmonization in EU countries.

In 2004, as the EU extended to countries of Central and Eastern Europe, Otmar Seul had yet another innovative idea of creating French-German summer universities with other countries, focusing on the topic of European identity, of its assumptions and policies in the context of European integration and of globalisation.

French-German Summer Universities with other countries

In Europe 

In September 2012, the appointed Minister for European affairs, Bernard Cazeneuve, patron of the Second French-German and European Summer University on energy and environmental law, paid tribute to a form of academic pré-rentrée by stating that its “success cannot be denied and can even be exported, thus enhancing the influence of the French-German cooperation in Europe”. The University of Paris Ouest-Nanterre-La Défense was the first to create French-German and European summer universities in legal sciences. While the French-German cooperation has proven to be an excellent vector of academic exchanges between the two countries, the French-German integrated curricula open their activities also to universities of other EU and even non-EU countries. Summer universities designed by Otmar Seul display assets that make them unique in comparison to traditional academic offerings:

Since 2004, these summer universities – following the example of the first and main one organized each year in cooperation with the Universities of Frankfurt on Main and Vilnius in the Lithuanian capital - follow the ongoing process of harmonization of legislations and practices in the European Union. Essentially built up in the field of European comparative law, they not only contribute to mutual legal understanding, but also to the discovery of the countries’ societal dimensions. The diversity of participants - such as historians, political scientists, economists, and sociologists - enables a multidisciplinary approach to dealing with legal questions and sometimes reveals unexpected issues.

Summer universities also lend themselves to innovative educational approaches. Defined as a forum open to dialogue, they are likely to contribute to a better perception of law and to the intellectual enrichment of both postgraduate students and PhD students. They may even enhance PhD students’ academic abilities due to their appreciation as interlocutors between researchers and professionals. The workshops allow intensive implication of young researchers through an interactive approach. For some graduate students, the work is based on preliminary research on the topic of their future thesis, which is encouraged (as for PhD students) by close cooperation with a French-German doctoral college that will be expanded to a European level in the future.

Summer universities are seen as an occasion to transmit national legal cultures – as much as possible - in their national languages. This concept is spurred on by the idea of Europe promoting its linguistic and cultural diversity. 
Another summer university is organised with the University of Potsdam and the State University of Belarus since 2011 in Minsk, the capital of Belarus, a member of the Commonwealth of Independent States (CIS). This Summer University encourages the participants to reflect on the evolution of law within a European legal area in a larger context as it now includes non-EU countries.

Since 2014, the University of Paris Ouest-Nanterre-La Défense and the University of Münster (Germany) works together with, among others, the Ss. Cyril and Methodius University (Macedonia), the University of Pristina (Kosovo), the University of Podgorica (Montenegro)  and the State University of Tirana (Albania) in order to create an unprecedented itinerant summer university in the Balkans. For the Balkan States, the European perspective (that of a future EU adhesion) exposes them to the irreversibility of political, economic and social reforms that these countries must put in place as well as peace and regional stability.

In Maghreb and Latin America 

The “delocalization of the campus via the summer university” (O. Seul) is no longer limited to the European area. Paris Ouest-Nanterre and Potsdam were invited by the Robert Bosch Foundation and the French-German University (UFA/DFH) to work on an “interdisciplinary approach of public sciences: civil law, administrative law, politics, economy, society and comparative law”, and therefore founded a French-German dialogue with the Maghreb countries in 2013 in Tunis, in cooperation with Tunis-El Manar University (continued in 2014 in Casablanca, Morocco, with the Université Hassan 2, Faculty of Ain Sebaa). They offer students the opportunity to:
 analyze current legal, political, economic and socio-cultural developments in Tunisia and, whenever possible, in other Maghreb countries in the process of rebuilding; 
 examine historical experiences of different countries (France, Germany, Maghreb countries) in the fields mentioned above through a multidisciplinary approach in order to highlight similarities and converging points that could support the discussion about the most appropriate public policies for the situation in the Maghreb;
 broaden the debate to the Mediterranean region that is at the crossroads of European and North African rights, and in particular to the implementation conditions of a common cooperation framework.

The 2014 Summer University at the University of Hassan II Casablanca (Morocco) was devoted to the theme "Law and Religion − common denominators and possible conflicts between religious norms, state norms and international law".
In 2013, the Nanterre model was also exported for the first time to a Latin American country: a French-German-Peruvian Summer University about “Democracy and the State of Law” was created at the Pontificia Universidad Catolica del Peru in Lima. Two innovations mark this event: not only does it go beyond the academic framework by opening itself to civil society, but - as suggested by Eda Rivas A. Franchini, Peruvian Minister of Justice – this event is also given a formative role that is beneficial to senior officials of the Ministry of Justice, especially in the fields of the defense of human rights, governance of a social State of law and citizen democracy.

Research on industrial democracy and the participation of employees in Europe 

Otmar Seul offers courses in labour law, legal German and classes of German and European civilization at the University of Paris Ouest and in partner universities of the Nanterre Network.

The French-German and European intercultural dimension characterizes his research. In his thesis about the consideration by French unions of “workers’ right to direct expression” introduced by the Auroux acts in France, republished in 2012 - with the title Arbeitnehmerpartizipation im Urteil der französischen Gewerkschaften: Sozialreformen unter der Präsidentschaft François Mitterrands (1982-1985) - he explained the interest of West German research in the French corporate reform by the negative results of the German co-management system regarding participation in the workplace. The transposition of the idea of industrial democracy in social legislation and the practice of social dialogue in France, Germany and other EU countries is the main topic of Otmar Seul's work. “The direct participation of workers in company decisions in France and Germany: theories, rights and practices”, his book published in 2011, is an overview of his academic activities between 1968 and 2000 (of which he presented the results officially in 1998 (HDR) in order to obtain the authorization to conduct researches at the University of Paris Ouest-Nanterre–La Défense).

Upon his arrival in France in 1971, Otmar Seul joined a research group about self-management at the School for Advanced Studies in Social Sciences (EHESS). He is particularly interested in the critics of the journal Praxis (that brings together the cream of the Yugoslav intelligentsia) about the lived experience of the “self-managed Yugoslavian socialism”.

His recent work is dedicated to the harmonisation of workers’ rights in the countries of the European Union. The collective work he published in 2009 in cooperation with Peter Jansen - The workers’ participation in company decisions in an enlarged Europe: traditions in the West, innovations in the East?  – reveals a strong tendency to establish systems of union representation (monist system) at the expense of the dual system adopted in France and Germany where the delegated participation is based on the systemic complementarity between institutions of elected representatives and unions.

The editorial activities of Otmar Seul show his intercultural and interdisciplinary orientation: he is the founder (1994) and Director of the collection Legal German/ Languages and European legal and political cultures, edited by the French-German program of legal sciences at the University of Paris Ouest-Nanterre–La Défense. He is also the co-founder and co-director (2010) of the collection Legal and political cultures published by Peter Lang in Bern, Berlin, Frankfurt a. M., New York, Oxford, Vienna, in collaboration with Stephanie Dijoux, his successor as co-Director of the integrated curricula in Paris-Ouest and Potsdam.

Humanitarian activities and efforts for citizenship at the university 

After having completed his literature degree at the Johannes Gutenberg University of Mainz (1965-1969, Staatsexamen in History and Romance studies) and thereafter worked as a trainee teacher (Studienassessor) at the Kurfürstliche Schloss-Gymnasium in Mainz, Otmar Seul got involved in humanitarian and third-world activities.

Action Committee for Biafra (1968-1970) 

In 1968, with other members of the catholic student association Unitas Willigis, Otmar Seul created an Action Committee for Biafra, a breakaway region of Nigeria (“Republic of Biafra”) at war with the military federal government between 1967 and 1970. The Committee's action followed the movement of pro-Biafra initiatives that were emerging at the time in the Federal Republic of Germany. Combining humanitarian assistance with actions raising awareness among the media and political institutions, the activities of the Mainz Committee were supported by associative networks of the academic community, the Churches and by the Biafra-Aktionskomitee in Bonn. They reflect the emergence of a new type of humanitarian aid developed in the 1970s by international NGOs such as the Society for Threatened Peoples (Gesellschaft für bedrohte Völker: GfbV, resulting from Aktion Biafra Hilfe in 1970, Hamburg) or Médecins sans frontières (1971).

Actions in favour of foreign students at the University of Mainz and of international academic cooperation (1970-1971) 

In 1970/1971, Otmar Seul worked at the University to improve the reception of foreign students and to defend their interests by elected representatives, cooperating closely with self-managed student representation authorities (AStA, Studentenparlement). On December 17, 1970, the first General Assembly of foreign students was organized under his leadership in order to elect a provisional representation with the task of setting up a permanent one and of suggesting solutions to the most urgent problems revealed by a survey.  The survey dealt with study and life conditions of foreign students (discrimination in terms of access to services and resources available for students, xenophobia shown by owners towards foreign tenants, misuse of the German Law on foreigners’ residence (Ausländergesetz), which, among others, infringed their freedom of opinion and expression).

Being in favour of the French-German reconciliation and contributing to the student exchanges with the University of Dijon (1966, 1967) as part of the twinning between Mainz and Dijon, Otmar Seul suggested the implementation of academic cooperation with Eastern Europe countries during the east–west conflict. Between 24 February and 4 March 1971, during the Croatian Spring, he organised the first visit of a student delegation from the Johannes Gutenberg University in the capital of Croatia, that was at the time a federal state of socialist Yugoslavia (meeting with Ivan Zvonimir-Čičak, one of the leaders of the student movement, future leader of the International Helsinki Federation for Human Rights). The Yugoslavian self-management model became a matter of reflection for his (future) research on industrial democracy.

Action within the Cité Internationale Universitaire of Paris (1972-1974) 

Having chosen to pursue his academic career in France, Otmar Seul started giving German language and civilisation courses in Paris (CPR, CRDP of the Academy of Paris-Sud) as of October 1971 and, from the 1974 school year onwards, at the University of Paris XII-Val de Marne of Créteil. As a lecturer at the Faculty of Arts and Social Sciences, he undertook doctoral studies on the conception of “industrial democracy” in France and Germany.

Living in the Maison de l’Allemagne (known today as the Maison Heinrich Heine) of the Cité Internationale Universitaire of Paris (CIUP), he fought for real participation of students and researchers in the management of host houses. A series of conflicts between residents committees and management concerning the rights and freedoms of residents and housing conditions (which can lead to eviction or even houses closures) brought the committees to hold a meeting on 2 and 3 March 1974 at the Maison des Arts et Métiers, to adopt a structure based on self-defense and mutual aid as imagined by Otmar Seul: the Coordination of Residents Committees of the CIUP. This transitory structure encouraged the head of the CIUP to integrate residents in the decision-making process at all levels of governance (formalization of an Assembly of delegates of Residents Committees; election by the Assembly of four administrators sitting at the CIUP Administration Council; possibility for the residents committees to participate in the administration council of their host houses).

By offering its forty residences a "cultural intermingling," the CIUP can hardly escape the politicisation that reflects the clashes between divided nations and the East / West conflict. On January 24, 1973, Otmar Seul, vice president of the Residents' Committee of the Maison de l’Allemagne, delivered, with thirty residents, an open letter addressed to the Government of the Federal Republic of Germany at the German Embassy in Paris. On the occasion of Chancellor Willy Brandt's visit to France, the German students and researchers criticized the Nobel Peace Prize holder and former anti-Nazi resistance fighter's silence about the bombing of cities in North Vietnam: “We feel appalled and ashamed that the German government has so little memories of what happened and so little reaction towards what is happening in this new Oradour.” (Le Monde, January 24, 1975).

Associate assistant at the University of Paris XII-Val de Marne from 1982 on, Otmar Seul is close to the new social movements that will lead to the creation of Green parties in Germany and France. During summer 1982, as he studied the functioning of an agricultural cooperative in Nicaragua, he discovered the Sandinista agrarian reform structured around self-managed microstructures which encouraged him to support a solidarity network for small farmers.

Action promoting citizenship in French university 

Working since October 1989 as a lecturer and then as a Professor of legal German at the University of Paris Ouest-Nanterre-La Défense, Otmar Seul considered that the position of research-professor involves reflecting on the achievement of citizenship in the university that fills the gaps in established structures of representative democracy.

As he is in favour of student participation in the management of French-German integrated curricula, Otmar Seul developed a student representation system in 1989/90. It is based on the election - at every study level - of delegates who submit student complaints and their improvement propositions to the Head of Education and to the Administration concerning the functioning of the programs and their study conditions.

In March 2008, the Association des diplômés du cursus en droit franco-allemand Paris Ouest/Potsdam (ACFA) was created, impelled by Otmar Seul. Its tasks are the promotion of the double degree, the mutual assistance among its members as well as contributing to a reflection on the challenges of European integration.

Honoured both in France and Germany 

For his decisive contribution to an innovative program and for having formed generations of law professionals at the service of French-German relations, Otmar Seul was awarded one of the highest distinctions of the Federal Republic of Germany in March 2010: the Officer's Cross of the Order of Merit of the Federal Republic of  Germany (Verdienstkreuz, 1. Klasse) by the Ambassador Reinhard Schäfers at the Hôtel de Beauharnais, official residence of German ambassadors in Paris.

This distinction was not the first one received by Otmar Seul, who was also given in 2002, by the Law Faculty of the University of Potsdam, the title of doctor iuris honoris causa. By decrees on December 18, 2002, and November 14, 2006, he was also respectively made Knight of the Order of Academic Palms and Knight of the National Order of Merit of the French Republic. In 2017, the Faculty of Law of the University of Vilnius (Lithuania) also awarded him the title of doctor iuris honoris causa.

Works 
Selected works by Suel:

Otmar Seul, Kaïs Slama, Kerstin Peglow (Hrsg.): Kulturvermittlung und Interkulturalität. Ein deutsch-französisch-tunesischer Dialog – politische, rechtliche und sozio-linguistische Aspekte, P.I.E. Peter Lang-Éditions scientifiques internationales Brüssel, Bern, Berlin, Frankfurt a.M., New York, Oxford, Wien 2016, 320 pages;

Arbeitnehmerpartizipation im Urteil der französischen Gewerkschaften: Sozialreformen unter der Präsidentschaft François Mitterrands (1982-1985), Südwestdeutscher Verlag für Hochschulschriften, Saarbrücken 2012 (thesis republication 1986), 530 pages;

La solidarité dans l’Union européenne / Solidarität in der Europäischen Union, Ed. Peter Lang  Bern, Berlin, Frankfurt s. M., New York, Oxford, Vienna 2012, 294 pages;

La participation directe des salariés aux décisions dans l’entreprise en France et en Allemagne : théories, droits et pratiques 1970-2000, Editions universitaires européennes, Sarrebruck 2011, 122 pages;

L’Europe élargie : la participation des salariés aux décisions dans l’entreprise. Traditions à l’Ouest, innovations à l’Est ? (dir. en coll. avec Peter Jansen), Ed. Peter Lang Bern, Frankfurt, New York, Oxford, Vienna, 2009, 430 pages;

Information, Consultation et Cogestion : droits et pratiques de la participation des salariés aux décisions dans l’entreprise en France et en Allemagne / Unterrichtung, Anhörung und Mitbestimmung: Rechte und Praktiken der Beteiligung der Arbeitnehmer an der Entscheidungsfindung im Unternehmen in Deutschland und Frankreich. (dir. in cooperation with Peter Jansen) ; no. 15 de la collection Allemand juridique-Langues et cultures juridiques et politiques européennes ; publications des formations « Droit allemand » de l’Université Paris Ouest-Nanterre-La Défense, 2008, 235 pages ;

Terrorismes : L’Italie et l’Allemagne à l’épreuve des « années de plomb » (1970-1980) : réalités et représentations du terrorisme (dir. in cooperation with Gius Gargiulo), Houdiard-Editeur, Paris 2008, 350 pages;

De la communication interculturelle dans les relations Franco-allemandes : Institutions – Enseignement – Entreprises (dir. in cooperation with Bernd Zielinski et Uta Dupuy), Ed. Peter Lang, Bern, Frankfurt, New York, Oxford, Vienna, 2003, 344 pages;

Les nouveaux Länder dans le processus d’unification (dir.), Actes des 2èmes et 4èmes Rencontres Franco-allemandes de Nanterre sur l’Allemagne unifiée, Editions Chlorofeuilles, Nanterre 2000, 2 volumes, 561 pages;

Implications juridiques et politiques de l’unification allemande (dir.), textes choisis des 1ères Journées d’information sur l’Allemagne unifiée, Editions Chlorofeuilles (Collection L’Allemagne unifiée), Nanterre 1998, 184 pages;

Démarches participatives et travail en groupe : l’impact du modèle japonais sur l’organisation du travail et les relations de travail en France et en Allemagne (dir.), Editions Chlorofeuilles (Collection La France et l’Allemagne en Europe), Nanterre 1998, 441 pages;

Participation par délégation et participation directe des salariés dans l’entreprise. Aspects juridiques et socio-économiques de la modernisation des relations industrielles en Allemagne, en France et dans d’autres pays de l’Union européenne (dir.), Editions Chlorofeuilles (Collection La France et l’Allemagne en Europe ), Nanterre 1994, 365 pages;

Das Arbeitermitspracherecht und andere neue Arbeitnehmerrechte in Frankreich aus der Sicht der französischen Gewerkschaften. Theoretische Vorstellungen und Reformpraxis (1982-1985), Dissertationsdruck Universität Oldenburg 1988, 613 pages + appendix;

Gewerkschaften in Frankreich : Geschichte, Organisation und Programmatik (in cooperation with Peter Jansen, Leo Kißler, Peter Kühne, Claus Leggewie), Editions Campus (Deutsch-französische Studien zur Industriegesellschaft), volume 2, Frankfurt and New York 1986, 288 pages;

Recherches sur l’autogestion, autogestion de la recherche : histoire et sociologie de la Seconde Conférence internationale sur l’Autogestion (dir. in cooperation with Yvon Bourdet, Olivier Corpet, Jacqueline Pluet, et al.), nos. 41-42 d’Autogestion et Socialisme, Ed. Anthropos, Paris, 1978, 311 pages.

Liber Amicorum Otmar Seul 

Bezzenberger, Tilman; Gruber, Joachim; Rohlfing-Dijoux, Stephanie :  Die deutsch-französischen Rechtsbeziehungen, Europa und die Welt / Les relations juridiques Franco-allemandes, l'Europe et le monde.  Liber amicorum Otmar Seul, Nomos Verlag,  Baden Baden, 2014, 570 pages.

See also 
Interview donnée par le Professeur Otmar Seul à l'ACFA (Association des diplômés des cursus franco-allemands en droit Paris Ouest/Potsdam), le 16 mai 2013
«Le professeur Otmar Seul reçoit la croix d’Officier de l’Ordre du Mérite» sur paris.diplo.de
Site des formations franco-allemandes et européennes de l'Université Paris Ouest

References

1943 births
Living people
German legal scholars
Academic staff of the University of Paris
Officers Crosses of the Order of Merit of the Federal Republic of Germany